Mixocetus is a genus of extinct baleen whale belonging to the family Tranatocetidae. It is known only from the late Miocene (Tortonian) of Los Angeles County, California.

Description
Mixocetus is a large-size mysticete with a long, narrow rostrum, a robust braincase, a nostril opening extending posteriorly just a few inches behind the antorbital processes, the posterior ends of the premaxillae, maxillae, and nasals tapering and extending posteriorly to a point between superior parts of supraorbital processes of the frontals, and a temporal fossa opening dorsally. Unlike Cetotherium, the antorbital process is larger, the lateral margins of the supraoccipital processes of the frontals are parallel to each other, there is a protruding lateral wall of the braincase, and the rear portion of the cranium has a very thick and posteriorly protruding exoccipital.

Taxonomy
The holotype of this species is LACM 882. It was collected from the Modelo Formation (early Tortonian, 10-11.6 Ma) of Lincoln Heights in Los Angeles County, California. It now resides as a permanent exhibit at the Natural History Museum of Los Angeles County in Exposition Park, Los Angeles.

References

Baleen whales
Miocene cetaceans
Miocene mammals of North America
Prehistoric cetacean genera
Fossil taxa described in 1934
Taxa named by Remington Kellogg